Sporting B.C. in international competitions is the history and statistics of Sporting B.C. in FIBA Europe and Euroleague Basketball Company competitions.

European competitions

European games
FIBA Korać Cup, 31-10-1979: AO Sporting Athinai - BG Bayreuth            66-59 (32-22) 
AO Sporting (coach: xxx): Dave Caligaris 22, Tom Kappos 4, Giorgos Skropolithas 8, Zakynthinos 18, Vasilopoulos 20, Kagidis 4.
BG Bayreuth (coach: Stephen McMahon): Stephen McMahon 22, Michel 6, Gottfried Oliwa 8, Buzz Harnett 19, Georg Kämpf 4, Graf, Wagner, Martin.

See also
 Greek basketball clubs in international competitions

External links
FIBA Europe
EuroLeague
ULEB
EuroCup

Greek basketball clubs in European and worldwide competitions
European